Angela Rosa Anderes (born 10 July 1919) was a Swiss figure skater. She competed in the ladies' singles event at the 1936 Winter Olympics. She won five Swiss national titles between 1935 and 1937 and again in 1939 and 1940.

References

External links
 

1919 births
Possibly living people
Swiss female single skaters
Olympic figure skaters of Switzerland
Figure skaters at the 1936 Winter Olympics
Figure skaters from Zürich